"Heart Like a Wheel" is a song by the British synth-pop group The Human League. It was the first single to be taken from the Human League's Romantic? album of 1990, and was written by former band member Jo Callis with Eugene Reynolds (of The Rezillos) and features vocals by Philip Oakey, Joanne Catherall and Susan Ann Sulley; with synthesizer by Neil Sutton. Recorded at Genetic Sound Studios during 1990, it was produced by Martin Rushent who was reconciled with the band after a seven-year gap.

Released in the UK in August 1990, "Heart Like a Wheel" reached number 29 in the UK, number 32 in the US, and number 64 in Australia.

Music video

The official music video for the song was directed by Andy Morahan.

Track listing

CD 1 1990, Virgin (VSCDT 1262)
"Heart Like a Wheel" – 4:30
"Heart Like a Wheel" (Extended Mix) – 6:55
"Rebound" – 3:58
"Heart Like a Wheel" (Remix) – 4:37

CD 2 1990, Virgin (VSCDX 1262)
"Heart Like a Wheel" – 4:30
"Heart Like a Wheel" (Extended Mix) – 6:55
"Rebound" – 3:58
"A Doorway" (Dub Mix) – 4:29

Charts

References

External links
 http://www.the-black-hit-of-space.dk/heart_like_a_wheel.htm
 http://www.league-online.com/hlaw1.html

1990 songs
1990 singles
The Human League songs
Music videos directed by Andy Morahan
Song recordings produced by Martin Rushent
Songs written by Jo Callis
Virgin Records singles